Herochroma curvata is a species of moth of the family Geometridae first described by Hong-Xiang Han and Da-Yong Xue in 2003. It is found in the Chinese provincies of Hainan and Guangxi.

The length of the forewings is 19–20 mm for males.

References

External links 
 A study on the genus Herochroma Swinhoe in China, with descriptions of four new species (Lepidoptera: Geometridae: Geometrinae). Acta Entomologica Sinica

Moths described in 2003
Pseudoterpnini
Moths of Asia